The Dance Goes On may refer to:

 The Dance Goes On (1930 film), an American crime film
 The Dance Goes On (1980 film), an American documentary film